O'Brien's Castle may refer to:
O'Brien's Castle (Inisheer)
Dromore Castle (County Clare)
A castle near to Dough Castle
Any other castle associated with the O'Brien dynasty